Mulbagal Assembly constituency is one of the 224 constituencies in the Karnataka Legislative Assembly of Karnataka a south state of India. It is also part of Kolar Lok Sabha constituency.

Members of Legislative Assembly

Mysore State (Mulbagal Srinivaspur)
 1951 (Seat-1): G. Narayana Gowda, Indian National Congress
 1951 (Seat-2): T. Channaiah, Indian National Congress

 1957 (Seat-1): B. L. Narayana Swamy, Independent
 1957 (Seat-2): Narayanappa, Indian National Congress

 1962: J. Narayanappa, Indian National Congress

 1967: T. Channaiah, Indian National Congress

 1972: P. Muniyappa, Independent

Karnataka State
 1978: J. M. Reddy, Indian National Congress (Indira)

 1983: Beeregowda, Independent

 1985: R. Venkataramaiah, Communist Party of India (Marxist)

 1989: M. V. Venkatappa, Indian National Congress

 1994: R. Srinivasa, Janata Dal

 1999: M. V. Venkatappa, Indian National Congress

 2004: R. Srinivas, Janata Dal (Secular)

 2008: Amaresh, Indian National Congress

 2013: Kothur G. Manjunath, Independent

 2018: H. Nagesh, Independent

See also
 Kolar district
 List of constituencies of Karnataka Legislative Assembly

References

Assembly constituencies of Karnataka
Kolar district